The judiciary of Poland are the authorities exercising the judicial power of the Polish state on the basis of Chapter 8 of the Constitution of Poland. As in almost all countries of continental Europe, the Polish judiciary operates within the framework of civil law.

The courts, designated by the Constitution as those exercising the administration of justice, are the bodies that review the vast majority of cases, with the exception of those specifically assigned to the two tribunals. The courts are formally divided into common courts which are the courts that have jurisdiction covering all matters other than those specifically assigned to other courts (and thus include civil, commercial, labour and social insurance law disputes as well as most criminal cases), administrative courts, which review complaints challenging the legality of administrative proceedings and their outcomes, and the military courts, which serve as criminal courts for the military. The Supreme Court is considered distinct from the common or military courts, in spite of its role as the court of last resort in all non-administrative cases; at the same time, the Supreme Administrative Court is the top court for administrative matters. Everyone has a guaranteed right to appeal to a court of higher instance, but appeals and cassations to the apex courts are limited by law; therefore, only a fraction of cases may reach them.

There are currently two tribunals established by the Constitution, namely the Constitutional Tribunal and the State Tribunal, which are separate from the rest of the judiciary. The former rules on the compliance of challenged statutes with the Constitution and is the only court in Poland empowered with striking down acts and regulations which it deems unconstitutional. The State Tribunal has exclusive jurisdiction over indictments for crimes committed by the highest state officials, but it convenes very rarely.

Court judges in Poland are appointed by the president of Poland upon nomination by the National Council of the Judiciary, an auxiliary body established for this purpose by the Constitution, and generally serve until they reach the age of 65 or 70. They are assisted or supplemented by various other judicial officials in the court, including court assessors, law clerks, registrars and lay judges. Professionals such as bailiffs and probation officers act on the court's behalf to enforce judges' orders. In contrast to the court judges, the ones sitting in tribunals (with the exception of those sitting there ex officio) are elected by the Sejm with a simple majority of its deputies.

Several issues plague the Polish judiciary. The courts are widely seen to be too slow, and the trust in the court system is low among the general population. Changes to the judiciary carried out from 2015 by the ruling United Right coalition, ostensibly aimed at remedying these handicaps, caused much controversy and provoked an ongoing constitutional crisis. The conservative government is generally accused, in Poland as well as internationally, of trying to take over the courts, which created a conflict between judges appointed before the Law and Justice-led coalition made changes to the judiciary and their supporters and those appointed by the new rules. The disciplinary system, widely considered to be non-independent, has in particular drawn condemnation and led the European Court of Justice (ECJ) to order the suspension of the Disciplinary Chamber of the Supreme Court and to impose a €1-million-per-day fine since Poland did not comply with the order. The Constitutional Tribunal, widely seen as captured by the Law and Justice party, has issued decisions aiming to thwart the application of the unfavourable rulings of the ECJ and the European Court of Human Rights by asserting they were issued outside the courts' competences and without regard to the Polish Constitution.

Structure 

This section describes the legal state of the structure of the judiciary as of 15 July 2022.

Common courts 

The common courts, according to article 177 of the Constitution, are the courts of general jurisdiction, i.e. they rule on all cases in which the jurisdiction has not been explicitly transferred to other courts. This includes a broad range of cases, including civil, criminal, labour, economic and insurance law. The territorial jurisdiction of these courts and their creation is regulated by the minister of justice.

Poland has a three-tier system of common courts. Most of the cases land in one of 318 regional courts, whose rulings may be appealed to 47 district courts. The latter courts also hear some cases in their original jurisdiction, which tend to be cases where high sums of money are disputed, the ones about serious crimes, and some that deal with narrow subjects, like intellectual property, surveillance, competition law, and personal rights. District court rulings issued in the original jurisdiction may be appealed to one of 11 appeal courts; each of the latter also has an affiliated disciplinary panel hearing cases against common court judges as the original disciplinary jurisdiction, except for the cases reserved by law for the Chamber of Professional Responsibility. After the courts of two instances have reviewed their cases, a cassation or its equivalent (see below) may be lodged in the Supreme Court in cases allowed by law.

Apart from their strictly judicial duties, the common courts in Poland maintain several registries. The National Court Register (Krajowy Rejestr Sądowy) maintains information about most companies in Poland; other such databases include the land and mortgage registry (księgi wieczyste), registry of press outlets, political parties, pension and investment funds, family foundations, ships, and pledges.

Military courts 
The military courts are specialised criminal courts for the Polish Armed Forces and its civilian personnel, as well as foreign soldiers and their personnel during their duties if the treaties allow them to be tried on Polish soil. There are seven garrison military courts (wojskowy sąd garnizonowy) under the jurisdiction of two district military courts (wojskowy sąd okręgowy), which roughly correspond to the regional and district common courts, respectively. The creation of military courts and their territorial jurisdiction are regulated by the minister of defence, while the minister of justice makes internal regulations for the court.

Article 654 of KPK mentions exceptions to these cases, which include any cases that would have been otherwise tried by a sąd okręgowy, or crimes committed by officers of the rank of mayor or higher, or by soldiers of the foreign armed forces. The disciplinary panels affiliated by the district military courts will also hold trials for disciplinary cases against military judges, except for those heard by the Chamber of Professional Responsibility as the original disciplinary jurisdiction.

Supreme Court 

The Supreme Court (Sąd Najwyższy) is the highest court for verdicts made in common and military courts, but is not considered part of either.

In its main capacity, it serves as a court of cassation reviewing selected verdicts of the courts of second instance, which cannot be appealed further (i.e., district courts or district military courts for cases originating in regional or military garrison courts, respectively; and appeal courts for cases originating in district courts). For some staturorily created regulatory colleges, cassations are also possible against the rulings of their disciplinary organs.

If the case originates within a district military court, a disciplinary panel either for common court judges (affiliated with an appeal court), military court judges (affiliated with a district military court), or for public prosecutors (affiliated with the minister of justice), the Supreme Court will process it as a court of second instance because all of these organs are directly below the Supreme Court in the judicial hierarchy. As an exception, any disciplinary cases against its own judges, or the most grave disciplinary cases against public prosecutors as well as against common or military court judges, are tried in the Supreme Court.

Extraordinary cassations may be entered in virtually any case at any time; other methods of complaint/cassation have limitations, and cases related to some matters may not be subject to cassation at all, when specifically excluded by an act.

Among other duties, the Supreme Court reviews all complaints about referendums and parliamentary, European Parliament and presidential elections and certifies the validity of these. The Court is also able to present its opinion on the draft bills that affect the judicial interpretation of other legislation.

It is legally divided into five chambers (izby) headed by the Presidents of the Supreme Court. The Civil Chamber reviews civil, economic and family law cases; the Criminal Chamber rules on criminal matters and in all cases related to the military courts. The Labour and Social Insurance chamber issues rulings on labour law in cases not related to the Supreme Court judges themselves, which are reviewed by the Chamber of Professional Responsibility. The latter hears also disciplinary cases of common, military and Supreme Court judges, as well as those of public prosecutors. The Chamber of Extraordinary Control and Public Affairs makes decisions about countrywide elections, while also ruling on some narrow areas of law (e.g. competition cases) and hearing complaints about technical issues of judgements (e.g. if a party to the case objects to the lack of independence of judges or the speed of processing the case).

The Supreme Court has been embroiled in numerous controversies since the Law and Justice (PiS) party launched an overhaul of the court in 2017, making a failed attempt to force a substantial proportion of its judges into early retirement and substituting them with politically aligned nominees. The legitimacy of the Disciplinary Chamber (fully appointed by a partisan-controlled National Council of the Judiciary) has been in particular widely challenged and the European Court of Justice ordered its suspension. After more than a year of delay, the President has signed into law the bill disbanding the controversial chamber (which was reformed as the Chamber of Professional Responsibility), which will not change its jurisdiction but will abolish the autonomy it had within the Supreme Court, modify the method of appointment, allow the review of decisions made by the Disciplinary Chamber and introduce the possibility to file a procedural complaint about the judge's independence.

Administrative courts 

Before a party can seek redress in an administrative court, all administrative appeal options (if available) must be exhausted, thus making the challenged decision final. The bodies to which these appeals should be lodged are outlined in article 17-18 of the Code of Administrative Procedure. If unsatisfied with the outcome of the administrative appeal of the decision, the party may further challenge it by submitting the judgment for judicial review through a complaint to one of the 16 voivodeship administrative courts (wojewódzki sąd administracyjny, WSA).

The administrative courts in general hear complaints on decisions and administrative rulings of government bodies (article 3 of the Law on Proceedings Before Administrative Courts, or PPSA), though some decisions may be exempted from the administrative courts' jurisdiction by statute. They may not substitute the judgment of administrative organs, but will only control the validity of their decisions in the light of administrative law. The administrative courts notably do not accept witness nor expert testimony other than that obtained during administrative procedure.

A cassation complaint may be brought to the Supreme Administrative Court (Naczelny Sąd Administracyjny, NSA), which is the court of last resort for administrative law matters; despite being called a cassation, it may be lodged against any ruling of the lower court due to the constitutional guarantee of judicial review, there being only two levels of administrative judiciary. The NSA additionally hears disciplinary proceedings against administrative judges, both on trial and on appeal. This court is divided into three chambers: Finance (finansowa), which resolves tax-related issues, Commerce (gospodarcza), which deals with issues related to financial instruments and corporate law, and the General Administration (ogólnoadministracyjna) chamber which deals with issues not covered by the other two chambers.

Constitutional Tribunal 

The Constitutional Tribunal (Trybunał Konstytucyjny) is the judicial organ competent for constitutional law cases, similar to those existing in many European countries. While it is often called a "top court", it is technically a tribunal, distinct from the courts. It does not deal with the merits of particular court cases, reviewing instead the constitutionality of laws such as international agreements ratified by Poland, laws enacted by the Parliament, as well as regulations issued by executive organs. Such review may be initiated upon submission by a party mentioned in article 191 of the Constitution. According to article 122(3) and article 133(2), the President, before signing a law or an international treaty, may additionally request the Tribunal to assess their constitutionality. Also, article 79 of the Constitution grants the right to lodge a constitutional complaint challenging the laws applied to the contested decision or verdict, but only after all other legal steps are exhausted. In all of these cases, should the Constitutional Tribunal find the law non-compliant with the Constitution, it has the power to strike it down.

Additional duties of the Tribunal include deciding whether a political party's purpose violates the Constitution, ruling on the jurisdiction disputes of central government organs mentioned in the Constitution, and declaring the President incapable of performing their duties if they were not able to communicate it to the Marshal of the Sejm. According to article 190 of the Constitution, all of the Tribunal's decisions are non-reviewable and binding.

State Tribunal 
The State Tribunal (Trybunał Stanu) is a special judicial organ with exclusive jurisdiction over trials of the highest political offices of Poland in cases defined by the Constitution, namely (among active ones): the President, the Prime Minister, ministers, the President of the National Bank of Poland, the President of the Supreme Audit Office, members of the National Broadcasting Council (KRRiT), and legislators. The President may only be tried by the State Tribunal for their crimes; ministers are tried for all abuses of office and breaking the laws and the Constitution, other high executive officers are tried for breaking the laws and the Constitution, while legislators may only appear before the State Tribunal for profiting from, or buying the property of central or local governments using their businesses. The Tribunal holds both trials and appeals, though these are heard by different panels of State Tribunal judges. The decisions of the Tribunal cannot be appealed to other bodies and may not be annulled by pardon (article 139 of the Constitution).

In practice, the State Tribunal is used very rarely. It has only issued three verdicts since its inception in the current design in 1982. Only two people have been convicted by the State Tribunal. It is hard to refer top politicians to the State Tribunal due to the supermajority requirements: the Constitution provides that a 2/3 majority in the National Assembly (a body formed on rare occasions by all Sejm and Senate members sitting together in a joint session) is needed to vote in favour of impeachment of the president of Poland, and that only a 3/5 majority in the Sejm may indict the prime minister of Poland or the members of his cabinet; an additional complication is the inherently political nature of the way the Constitution allows to refer a person to the State Tribunal. Due to the rarity of its operation, doubts have been raised about whether this system of accountability of politicians is effective.

Procedure 
Poland is a country whose law is based on the civil law legal system. As is often the case with civil law countries, the proceedings, even though they have some characteristics of the adversarial system, are predominantly grounded in the inquisitorial system. The judges are supposed to take an active part in investigating the facts of the case, particularly in criminal law cases, and pre-trial proceedings are extensive. There was a brief period of reform of the procedures in the direction of a more adversarial system, but it was reverted after the current governing party came to power in 2015.

The laws in Poland often make reference to various specific procedures, which in most cases relate to one of the laws below. These describe the rules of procedure and evidence, along with detailed roles of each party and court official:
the Code of Civil Procedure in general, and, in particular cases, the Bankruptcy Law, the Restructuring Law, and Title IX Section 3 of the Public Procurement Law, for civil law matters;
 the Petty Offences Procedure Code, the Code of Criminal Procedure, the Penal Enforcement Code, Title II of the Fiscal Penal Code, Chapter 3 of the Act on Disclosure of Information about Documents of State Security Bodies from the Years 1944–1990 and the Contents of these Documents, and Title II of the Act on Maritime Chambers, for criminal matters;
 the Act on Juvenile Delinquency Proceedings, which is based on civil procedure but includes criminal procedure elements;
 the Code of Administrative Procedure, the Law on Proceedings Before Administrative Courts and the Act on Enforcement Proceedings in Administration for administrative matters;
 the Act on Organization and Procedure Before the Constitutional Tribunal and the Act on the State Tribunal, for proceedings before those judicial bodies.

A universal rule for judicial proceedings in Poland is that any party to a proceeding before a court is guaranteed the right to appeal a decision or a ruling (the two-instance principle, as defined by the article 176 of the Constitution), though this does not include the Constitutional Tribunal, whose decisions are final and may not be appealed to any other organ. The venues of appeal vary greatly by designation, depending on the trial court and the type of case, as specified in the relevant section.

Poland does not operate on binding precedent and Polish courts do not create law by issuing their verdicts (wyrok), instead relying on whatever statutes are in force, but the verdicts of the Supreme Court (SN) and of the Supreme Administrative Court (NSA) are widely followed in their respective domains of law. Nevertheless, their rulings may bind the lower courts in particular cases. For example, if the court of the second instance requests guidance from the Supreme Court about laws that it struggles to apply, the conclusion of the SN legally binds the court but only in that particular case. Additionally, the Supreme Court may issue internal legal principles (zasady prawne) approved by at least 7 judges, which in fact are law interpretations issued for mandatory use by other SN judges when issuing their verdicts. These regulations do not bind lower courts. In administrative courts, however, these internal legal principles are required to be followed both by NSA judges and by WSA judges, and any deviations considered by a lower court should be referred to a 7-member panel of the Supreme Administrative Court. Notably, although verdicts of the Constitutional Tribunal "have universal legal force" and, as Jackowski argues, are approximately equivalent to the acts of parliament in the hierarchy of Polish law, the reasoning with which the verdict comes is not binding.

Judges may additionally request legal guidance from the Constitutional Tribunal, according to article 193 of the Constitution, and may send a preliminary reference to the European Court of Justice (ECJ) in European Union law matters, which was even the case for the Constitutional Tribunal itself. Responses to both types of requests are binding on the court which sent the reference. Since Poland is a member of the Council of Europe, citizens may appeal the contested ruling to the European Court of Human Rights after exhausting all legal remedies in Poland, and the verdict will bind Polish authorities.

Staff

Judges and court assessors

National Council of the Judiciary

The National Council of the Judiciary (KRS) is an auxiliary constitutional organ, holding by virtue of article 179 of the Constitution the exclusive authority to nominate candidates for court judges; it also nominates candidates for court assessors, who eventually may become judges. Despite the theoretical possibility that the people with appropriate experience in practising law may aspire to the bench in higher courts, in practice, the vast majority of candidates for positions in upper-instance courts has been nominated by the National Council of the Judiciary among the judges already holding office in a lower-instance court.

Article 187 of the Constitution assigns the following proportions to the composition of members: one member appointed by the President of Poland, four MPs from the Sejm, two senators, and fifteen court judges (appointed at the same time due to a ruling of the Constitutional Tribunal) from all branches of the courts, who are appointed for four-year terms. The First President of the Supreme Court, the President of the Supreme Administrative Court and the Minister of Justice are given their seats ex officio. Prior to 2018, the National Council of the Judiciary Act apportioned the fifteen judges into quotas: a 2011 law mandated two Supreme Court judges, two appeal court judges, eight district court judges, two administrative court judges, and one military court judge. The requirement for strict apportionment has since been abolished. Also before 2018, all of the member judges were chosen by the judges themselves, as has been the custom; however, the Sejm has since been granted the power to appoint the members among the judiciary by a simple majority vote, thereby effectively granting control over the KRS to whoever happens to have the majority in the lower house of the Polish parliament, which was the Law and Justice party at the time the law went into force.

Procedure of appointment 
The appointment of new judges and court assessors happens in two stages. First, the KRS submits its list of candidates for approval to the President. Refusal by the KRS to include a candidate in the nominations list may in general be contested in the Supreme Court, but according to current law (which in that respect was found by the ECJ to be likely in violation of European Union law), there is no legal recourse in the case when the KRS denies the Supreme Court nomination. Then, according to the current constitutional and statutory regulations, the President appoints new judges and court assessors among those nominated by the KRS upon receiving their oath.

There is no timeframe within which the President must publish their decision. Whether the President may refuse or refrain from appointing a person nominated by the National Council of the Judiciary as a candidate for judicial office is a subject of scholarly dispute, with some contending that the role intended for the President by the fathers of the Constitution is purely formal or ceremonial, while others consider it a prerogative exercised by the President at their discretion, a view supported by the absence of any constitutional deadline for a pending appointment. In practice, there have been instances where the President refused to appoint nominated candidates as judges, but it happens very rarely: according to a 2017 analysis, there have been only 20 cases out of more than 5,000 that the President refused to appoint candidates nominated by the KRS. In 2022, another 11 judges, who were nominated before 2018 by the KRS, were refused presidential appointments to the courts.

In case law, the administrative courts have repeatedly found lack of jurisdiction in respect of the presidential appointments of judges or their refusal, and the Constitutional Tribunal ruled consistently that these decisions are not subject to judicial review. The Constitutional Tribunal asserted in a controversial decision in K 3/21 that the European Union law allows the courts neither to control the legality of the judicial appointments by the President nor the legality of nominations or their refusal by the National Council of the Judiciary, declaring both activities to be unconstitutional.

Rights and duties 
The title of judge is granted by the President for life, though all of the judges must retire from active duty by the age of 70 (see table below). They may also be sent on leave in case of the changes in the jurisdiction of the courts, including their abolishment, or if the judge is physically or mentally unable to perform their duties (article 181 section 3 and 5 of the Constitution). Judges are immune from legal persecution and non-removable unless by a decision of a court; moreover, they cannot be imprisoned or arrested without the consent of a disciplinary court (articles 180–181 of the Constitution).

The court assessor is a position existing in the lowest courts of Poland, who can best be described as a judge on a trial period. The institution briefly disappeared from the Polish legal system as the previous regulations about court assessors, which included an increased role of the minister of justice, were found by the Constitutional Tribunal and the European Court of Human Rights not to be guaranteeing enough judicial independence. Since their reactivation in 2016, they have been appointed by a process similar to the way in which the judges are appointed. Court assessors share the same rights and responsibilities as that of regular judges and may issue verdicts and orders in the majority of cases. Exceptions include orders to detain a suspect during pre-trial proceedings, review of a decision to decline to take up the case or discontinue it, and family law matters.

There are some differences between court judges and court assessors. Unlike in the case with judges, the time of assessors' service is limited by law, as they may only exercise judicial duties as an assessor for four years in common courts and five years in administrative courts; however, after four years of assessorship in common courts, or two years in administrative courts, these temporary judges may apply for a position in a regional court or a voivodeship administrative court, respectively. Also, the requirements to serve as an assessor are somewhat lower (see table below).

Judges sitting in the tribunals 

The tribunals, unlike the courts, are not under the purview of the National Council of the Judiciary and their judges are not nominated by the KRS. Instead, it is a group of 50 Sejm members or the Presidium of the Sejm (the Marshal of the Sejm and the vice-marshals) that may nominate the candidates. According to article 194 of the Constitution, the Constitutional Tribunal judges are then elected by the Sejm by a simple majority for a nine-year non-renewable term, which starts upon taking an oath administered by the President. Whether it is valid for the Sejm to appoint judges in advance (for the terms starting during recess or beyond it) and whether the Sejm could have invalidated an appointment of a judge if the oath was not yet taken, or whether the President could legally withhold the administration of the oath, was the issue of the political crisis in 2015.

The State Tribunal consists of 19 members. Article 199 of the Constitution says that 18 of them (including two vice-chairpersons and 16 ordinary members) are to be elected by a simple majority by the Sejm for the duration of its term, while the position of the Chairperson of the State Tribunal is held ex officio by the incumbent First President of the Supreme Court).

In parallel with judges sitting in courts, the ones sitting in the tribunals are also immune from legal persecution and non-removable unless by a decision of the respective tribunal; moreover, they cannot be imprisoned or arrested without the consent of the respective tribunal.

Other judicial positions 
The law clerks also serve on the court but do not issue rulings, instead they assist judges in their decision-making and reduce their workloads. The position is held available only to trained jurists with a graduate degree. During court proceedings, the judges are also assisted by a court reporter (protokolant), who will, in addition to recording court proceedings, summons parties to the courtroom and performs routine tasks for the judge. Court reporters do not need to have any law experience.

The registrar is the person responsible for administrative matters of the judicial procedure and rulings (such as payment orders and enforcement of some court orders). In common courts, a registrar is also normally the person who heads the land registration chamber of the court or that of the economic law chamber insofar as it relates to liens. The person may also serve as a judge in bankruptcy cases and is the officer who is in charge of electronic writs of payment cases. The registrar also has some competences in criminal cases – for instance, the officer may reroute a potential criminal case to voluntary mediation, may decide to provide legal aid to a party upon its request and hears witnesses remotely. In administrative courts, the referendarz, in addition to administrative duties as described above, is a mediation officer by default.

The courts may usually also appoint special officers to execute their court decision. For example, probation officers are employees of the court that assist it in resocialisation efforts and perform certain other activities. Bailiffs, while not employees of the court, execute orders on behalf of the court that aim to settle debts.

The lay judges are non-professionals embodying the "societal factor in the organs administrating justice" envisaged by the article 182 of the Constitution. They adjudicate cases together with professional judges in some family and labour law cases, and investigate serious crimes. Their role and number has diminished somewhat over years, and their service is limited by law to 12 days per year, with only exceptional extensions. They are elected by municipal councils from candidates aged 30–70 years, and are assigned to one court only; some professionals may not become lay judges (see table below).

Remuneration 
The number of staff in each category, the basic salary as determined by law, and the mean salary for some jobs, are given in the table below.

Minimal requirements 
Several laws as well as the Constitution set the criteria which the candidates must meet in order to serve in the bodies exercising judicial power of the Polish state. The common requirement of all judges is that they must be Polish citizens of "flawless character" and must enjoy full civil rights; in addition to that, the Constitution bars political party and trade union members to join the judiciary, and forbids performing public activities that may undermine the independence of the judge or the courts. All statutes relevant to the justice organs forbid prospective judges from being a central government employee or a member of parliament; only State Tribunal members may work in local government organs. Professors and habilitated doctors of law at a Polish tertiary education facility may seek nomination to any of the judicial positions (assessors as well as judges), provided they also pass the criteria unrelated to necessary experience. Some of the criteria, not mentioned in this paragraph, are summarised in the table below.

Issues

Length of proceedings 
The Polish court system is considered to be slow, particularly the common courts. In 2021, it took an average of seven months for an average case to be processed in a regional court and more than ten months in a district court, with the time needed to process a case gradually rising since 2015. Longer proceedings are generally concentrated in the courts centred around larger cities; as of 2017, about 10% of cases required more than a year for resolution (with as much as 18.72% in Warsaw) and more than 1% of cases needed more than 3 years (of which almost 4% in Warsaw). The type of case is also a factor: in 2021, criminal trials in regional courts were often finished within four months, but litigation in labour law took almost a year on average to resolve; district courts have less variation.

On the European level, Poland has slower proceedings in the highest courts, and has in general slower processing of civil cases than the median. This problem is also noted by the United States Department of State and by the World Justice Project, which assigned the lowest grade to the timeliness of civil proceedings, which not only was behind other European countries but also much below the world average score (in criminal proceedings, the situation was still assessed as somewhat worse compared to its peers but was much better than in civil cases). In 2013, the Centre for Public Opinion Research (CBOS), a state-run pollster, found that by far the most common complaint about the Polish justice system was the length of court proceedings. On the other hand, the criminal cases and the voivodeship administrative courts are often quicker than the median among the Council of Europe members. The average tempo of processing all cases in the first instance (disposition time) has slowed over recent years and is now about the average of EU countries as of 2020.

The problem with the length of proceedings has been recognised by both Polish and international courts. According to the statistics provided by the European Court of Human Rights (ECHR), from the time since Poland joined the Council of Europe in November 1991, out of 1,027 judgments that found Poland guilty of breaches of the European Convention on Human Rights, the biggest share of them – 445 judgments – concerned excessively lengthy proceedings. The ECHR ruled in 2015 in Rutkowski et al. v. Poland that Poland offered inadequate protections for parties who suffer from long court proceedings, some of which have been dragged for years, despite a law, itself created after as a result of another ECHR case, theoretically aiming to address the problem. The Constitutional Tribunal wrote in the reasonings of a 2011 case that a civil lawsuit was "expensive and long", and the vice-minister of justice said the same in 2014. The length of proceedings caused cases such as the murder of Grzegorz Przemyk by Communist authorities in 1983 to be closed inconclusively as the indictments went past the prescriptive period.

According to a 2020 survey of Polish lawyers and attorneys at law, 95.8% of those professionals said that the excessive length of proceedings had a systemic character; they also said that problems occurred both on the judicial and the prosecutorial side. Various reasons were suggested for those problems. At the same time, most lawyers were afraid to make complaints about inadequate speed of processing the case for fear of angering the judge, and only 12% believed that this tool was effective. According to a November 2021 poll by Rzeczpospolita, 54% of respondents did not believe that the proceeded reforms of the judiciary would speed up the decision-making process.

Lack of popular support and trust 
The trust in the judicial system among the general population is low. A large slump in the trust in the court system happened in 1998–2007, as people did not see the court system as an impartial arbiter of the cases. Krystyna Daniel connected this slump to the general distrust of statutes and government organs, lengthy proceedings and media criticism (mostly about controversial court cases or irregularities in the judiciary). A particular plunge in support for the courts occurred in 2012, when numerous irregularities were found in the functioning of the courts in Gdańsk as they were investigating the insolvency of Amber Gold, a pyramid scheme company.

Only 30% approve of the current state of the judiciary, compared with 46% of negative voices, according to a March 2022 poll made by CBOS. The support for the courts has been oscillating around 30% since 2009, with relatively little variation across party preferences. As for the Constitutional Tribunal, disapproval spiked following the 2015 crisis and further went up following its ruling restricting abortion, but criticism is concentrated among voters who are left-leaning, less religious and opposing the Law and Justice (PiS) party. The diminution of trust in the Tribunal, along with worsening efficiency, is widely considered to be the reason behind lower numbers of constitutional law verdicts since 2015 and requests for legal guidance from the courts.

In December 2021, CBOS found that 46% of people preferred to resolve cases informally by non-judicial means, which number steadily increased since 2014 and approached values experienced in the communist Polish People's Republic; only 38% declared that the judiciary was better equipped to do that. The 2022 European Union Rule of Law report notes that only 24% of the general population has a good opinion of the independennce of the court system, but only 19% of companies surveyed approved of Polish judiciary, and the numbers were steadily decreasing. Recent changes to the courts, introduced successively since 2015 by PiS, did not seem to improve the perception of them and are not popular among the general electorate. According to a Rzeczpospolita poll in May 2022, only 14.2% of people approved the reform, compared to 53.6% of those who opposed it. Another poll, in December 2021, found that over 69% of people thought that the reform did not increase confidence in the courts.

Other issues 
Some of the Polish courts have seen signs of nepotism, e.g. favouritism during competition for judge positions and in salaries. These problems have also plagued the National Council of the Judiciary, which prompted the Supreme Court to annul some of its recommendations. That said, before 2015, the extent of corruption in Polish courts was not considered to be large, but it worsened in subsequent years as political forces started to assert more influence on the judiciary.

Another issue of concern is the usage of the so-called , whereby a suspect is held in repeatedly prolonged detention in order to be compelled either to confess or to testify against other defendants, a practice officially illegal nevertheless still undertaken under formal disguise of various pretexts such as safeguarding the undistorted course of a proceeding; the Helsinki Foundation of Human Rights noted that an average pretrial detention lasted for more than a year and, in its opinion, was overused relative to the less invasive preventative measures such as bail and police supervision. A lack of petititoner-friendly communications, excessive red tape and the excessive reliance on the letter of the law (lex) rather than the law itself (ius) are also noted as problems within the Polish judiciary. The Polish courts have also been severely impacted by the COVID-19 pandemic, in particular as related to the access to the justice system. The pandemic forced the courts to increasingly digitise its so far underused and inconsistently applied computer systems aiding decision-making, documentation and hearings; however, many documents are still being processed on paper and sent by post.

Rule of law concerns 

When PiS took power in 2015, it expressed its intent of clearing the justice system of Communist legacy and root out corrupt judges from the judiciary. It also promised to remedy long-standing problems of slowness and red tape, due to which the media favourable to the current government portrayed the system as out-of-touch and self-interested. However, a series of reforms to the Polish judiciary started in 2015 has proved controversial. They met in particular with the disapproval of the European Union authorities, which initiated Article 7 proceedings against a member state for the first time. The rule-of-law crisis in Hungary and Poland served as a trigger for adopting the EU's conditionality mechanism, which may deny the receipt of EU budget funds if the rule of law deficiencies prevent a proper implementation of the EU budget, and led to a suspension of Next Generation EU funds allocated for Poland. The European Parliament has repeatedly pressed the European Commission to act on the breaches of the independence of the judiciary, and even sued it in court for what it said was inadequate response to the violations.

Capture of the Constitutional Tribunal 

The Constitutional Tribunal (TK), like other courts with appointments made by political bodies, experienced some form of bias in rulings, but it was not very different from the situation in the analogical institutions in other countries. Since 2015, however, the TK has been stuffed with appointees favourable to the currently ruling party, including former politicians of PiS or friends of its leaders, leading scholars to see it as a captured judicial institution subservient to the Law and Justice government. Due to the irregularities in appointments to the Tribunal in 2015, the ECHR ruled that the Tribunal, when ruling with the so-called doubling judges (sędziowie-dublerzy) instead of those whose term started before the term of the 2015–2019 parliament was set to constitute, violated the right to a fair trial as it was an improperly constituted court.

The Constitutional Tribunal then delivered rulings aiming to insulate the justice system from ECHR scrutiny, first by issuing a ruling arguing that the ECHR had no jurisdiction to control the appointment of its own justices by asserting it was not a court within the meaning of the European Convention on Human Rights (described by Ewa Łętowska and Wojciech Tumidalski to be the Tribunal's "coming out") and then by expanding the ruling on the court system as a whole. As a result, the Ministry of Foreign Affairs told two people who won in the ECHR that they would not be paid compensations as the ministry argued that the Constitutional Tribunal's ruling forbade it from doing so.

The Tribunal also did the same with the treaties of the European Union by stating that the treaties are incompatible with the Polish Constitution insofar as they allowed the courts to question the appointments by partisan-controlled KRS or the President, aiming to thwart the application of ECJ's unfavourable judgments about the Polish judiciary and forcing it not to comply with ECJ's orders. This ruling sparked massive protests and raised concerns about Polexit. The European Commission has charged the Constitutional Tribunal with violations of EU law while issuing its verdicts.

Undue influence on judges 

The problem of undue influence of judges in Poland has existed for some time. A sting operation by Gazeta Polska Codziennie triggered a political scandal in 2012 by exposing the fact that a judge of a court in Gdańsk aquiesced easily to procedural demands made in relation to a particular case during a phone call by a journalist pretending to be a senior officer of the Chancellery of the Prime Minister. The judge, Ryszard Milewski, was disciplined for that violation and sent to a Białystok court.

Since the reform of common courts and the Supreme Court started in 2017, the judges almost unanimously expressed concern about worsening judicial independence, fearing retribution for criticism of the new laws. Some of the most vocal opponents of the changes to the judiciary were targeted by the state prosecution, and disciplinary proceedings were abused in an attempt to silence critics who, for example, sent preliminary requests to the European Court of Justice asking to assess judicial independence. There were also cases of judges being submitted to disciplinary action after issuing a ruling in opposition to the party's interest or demands of the prosecutor in the particular case. In addition to that, a change to the statutes regulating the courts (often called the "muzzle law") made it an offence to question the validity of appointments of judges by fellow judges, in essence those appointed by a partisan-controlled National Council of the Judiciary, even if there were legitimate concerns about them. This statute was criticised by the Venice Commission for violating the judicial independence and severely limiting the judges' freedom of speech. The 2021 rule of law report by the European Commission said that the mere prospect of being prosecuted in a judicial body having no guarantees of independence had created a chilling effect for judges. Rzeczpospolita also reported that the catalogue of offences after which disciplinary proceedings are initiated broadens, some of which are not related to the functioning of the court, like speeding and driving under the influence.

Partisan control of the National Council of the Judiciary 
An overhaul of the National Council of the Judiciary happened in late 2017, when the law came into effect that granted the Sejm powers to appoint 15 members of the judiciary (ruled legal by the Constitutional Tribunal in 2019); at the same time, the Tribunal ordered the judges on the Council to be appointed for a collective term, rather than individually, as had been the case earlier. Both changes were very controversial. All judges that had served on the Council were dismissed on 6 March 2018 without regard to their terms and substituted with judges favourable to PiS. The consensus of scholars is that a change to the term of some of the KRS's members ran afoul of the Constitution, though Mateusz Radajewski wrote that the Tribunal left the lawmakers with no better choice. The European Court of Human Rights, along with the scholars, criticised the Tribunal's decision in its ruling in March 2022 and ordered compensation for Jan Grzęda, a Supreme Administrative Court judge whose term was cut two years short. Another controversial provision was to lower the retirement age to 65 (thus removing about 40% of the Supreme Court members), with tying the prolongation of justices to the President's consent, but the ECJ ruled it to be illegal in light of European Union law.

In September and October 2018, the Supreme Administrative Court ordered a halt on Council's appointments to the Supreme Court to three of the five chambers, but the President ignored the NSA's order. The top administrative court later annulled around a dozen recommendations for appointment of new judges of the Supreme Court due to concerns about the lack of independence of the Council. The Venice Commission urged not to approve the politicisation of the KRS, while numerous scholars, the European Court of Justice (ECJ) and the European Court of Human Rights (ECHR) questioned the independence or the constitutionality and thus the validity of nominations made by the partisan-controlled KRS (sometimes called the neo-KRS). One of the most controversial changes was the creation of a disciplinary chamber of the Supreme Court, whose members were all nominated by the new iteration of the KRS, and which some have compared to the Star Chamber or to an extraordinary court (sąd wyjątkowy), which may not be created unless in times of war. Due to the lack of impartiality, the National Council of the Judiciary was expelled from the European Network of Judiciary Councils, and major legal and judicial organisations in Poland, as well as former Council members, asked to boycott the 2022 nomination procedure.

Given the doubts about the validity of the new KRS as well as other laws concerning the common courts and the judiciary, several courts have made preliminary requests to the ECJ about the overhaul of the judiciary or issued rulings aiming to resist the changes. The Supreme Court declared the two new chambers, the Disciplinary and that of Extraordinary Control and Public Affairs, illegal, and found the new KRS "systemically not independent of political interest". While this was promptly overturned by the Constitutional Tribunal, arguing that European law was not above the Polish Constitution, the consensus of scholars was that the Tribunal exceeded its competences as it could not assess the constitutionality of the Supreme Court's resolutions. A seven-member panel of the Criminal Chamber of the Supreme Court reaffirmed its previous decision in June 2022, declaring the partisan KRS "not equivalent to the constitutional organ [regulated] by article 187 paragraph 1", though ruling that only Supreme Court judges' appointments should be immediately invalidated.

The ECJ also delivered a judgment ordering the suspension of the Disciplinary Chamber, saying it has deep concern over this key element of the justice system overhaul. After the court's ruling had been ignored for some time, the ECJ applied unprecedented penalties of €1 million per day for non-compliance with the ECJ's decision. In an attempt to comply with the ruling, a new bill was adopted that changes the method of appointment, namely by letting the President choose 11 judges for a five-year term among the 33 that the Supreme Court proposes, but the law is seen as superficial and not resolving the underlying issue of political manipulation of disciplinary proceedings. Didier Reynders, the European Commissioner for Justice, said that the law does not fully conform with the ECJ's order and thus the European Commission will continue to subtract the fines from Polish funds.

In addition to that, several judges and lawyers sued in the ECHR to declare the Supreme Court chambers, with the controlling majority being appointed by the new body, to be incompatible with the European Convention of Human Rights, and thus invalidate its rulings. The Strasbourg court agreed, declaring the Disciplinary Chamber, the Chamber of Extraordinary Control and Public Affairs and the Civil Chamber not to be independent and impartial tribunals established by law.

Arbitrary secondment of judges 
The minister of justice, according to law, may second (delegować) a judge to a lower or, in some circumstances, to the higher courts and to the Ministry of Justice. The minister may also second a judge to administrative courts, the Chancellery of the President, to the Supreme Court or to an institution subordinate to the Ministry of Foreign Affairs upon the requests of the leaders of these agencies. However, the law does not require that the decisions of secondment, or the revocation thereof, have justifications. This arrangement has been described as prone to abuse by some human rights groups and legal experts. The European Court of Justice ruled that the system of purely arbitrary delegation of judges, where the minister of justice is at the same time the top prosecutor, violates European Union law; the Polish Ombudsman also argued that the unlimited powers in issuing delegations ran afoul of several articles of the Constitution, including by infringement on the President's prerogative to appoint judges to the positions the President decides.

Repercussions in Poland and abroad 

The judicial reforms have been met with fierce resistance from the judiciary, including the rank-and-file judges. Numerous protests were started against the reforms. They were also initiated abroad in front of Polish diplomatic institutions.

The rule of law crisis has prompted several courts to temporarily cease honouring the European Arrest Warrants from Poland, including courts in the Netherlands, Germany, Ireland, Slovakia and Spain. However, the ECJ ruled that the courts may not do so unless there are reasonable doubts as to the possibility of getting a fair trial in Poland.

See also
Law in Poland
Law enforcement in Poland
Lawyers in Poland

Notes

References

External links
 Portal of court cases by the Ministry of Justice, administrative cases by the Supreme Administrative Court and cases decided by the Constitutional Tribunal in Polish (selected judgments in English)
 The 2022 EU Justice Scoreboard, the Polish country profile on the Council of Europe's graphics and on the World Justice Project for international comparisons (in English)
 Rule of law reports by the European Commission and the Stefan Batory Foundation (in English)
 A report by the Ministry of Justice (2019) and by the Helsinki Foundation of Human Rights (2022) about the efficiency of Polish courts (in Polish)
 Spreadsheet with data about the length of court proceedings, from 2014 to Q1 2022
 ruleoflaw.pl – Documentation on the rule of law in Poland in English
 Verfassungsblog – occasional information about the legal events in Poland in English
 A guide to Polish legal citations